Sistema Plastics is a New Zealand company which manufactures food storage containers. It is based in Auckland and owned by Newell Brands.

Overview 
Brendan Lindsay founded Sistema Plastics from his home in Cambridge, New Zealand in 1987. The company name Sistema comes from the Italian word for systems. The company is focused on BPA-free plastic kitchen storage containers under the brand names KLIP IT and Klipo.

Newell Brands bought the company in 2017 for NZ$660 million (US$470 million).

Awards 
In 2018, Sistema was named Plastics Training Company of the Year by the New Zealand Plastics Industry. In 2019, Sistema won the Technology Innovator award in the Epicor Customer Excellence Global Awards programme, for its use of automated processes.

References

External links
 

Food storage containers
Manufacturing companies of New Zealand
Manufacturing companies established in 1987
New Zealand companies established in 1987
New Zealand brands
2017 mergers and acquisitions